The Greek Wiretapping Scandal, sometimes called the Greek Watergate, refers to the prolonged and en masse monitoring of the mobile phones of individuals prominent in the Greek political scene, including the president of the social democratic party, PASOK, Nikos Androulakis, the journalists Thanassis Koukakis and Stavros Michaloudis, as well as members of the government and close affiliates of Kyriakos Mitsotakis, among others.

Precursors to the main events 
On July 8 2019, just after the 2019 elections, the newly elected prime minister Kyriakos Mitsotakis placed the National Intelligence Service (NIS) under his direct control. On August 9 2019, Panagiotis Politis, a professor and syndicalist in University of Thessaly, stated that he had found a GPS tracker in his car. On November 2019, GPS trackers were found on cars and motorcycles belonging to members of the anarcho-communist collective Taksiki Antepithesi ("Social class counterattack") and a camera facing the collective's headquarters was found placed on a stationed car, which was later taken away with riot police escort. These events however were not addressed by most of mainstream media at the time.

The main events 

The mobile phones of all three individuals were hacked with illegal software called Predator, although it was only successfully installed on the journalists' phones. The revelations were followed by the resignations of the head of the NIS, Panagiotis Kontoleon, and the General Secretary of the Prime Minister and his nephew, Grigoris Dimitriadis. Ιn 2021 15,000 surveillance orders were issued.

Financial journalist Thanasis Koukakis who had previously investigated the Greek banking sector, heard from a government source that he was being surveilled by the Greek secret service. It was later discovered the violation of the privacy of his communications through the Predator software that had infected his mobile phone, on March 28, 2022, after an audit carried out on his behalf by the "Citizen Lab" of the University of Toronto. On July 26, 2022, the president of PASOK, Nikos Androulakis, filed a complaint to the Supreme Court for personal data breach, as the presence of a link related to the illegal Predator software was detected on his mobile phone.

On July 29, the Special Permanent Committee on Institutions and Transparency of the Parliament was convened where the Head of the NIS, Panagiotis Kontoleon and the president of Communications Privacy Authority, Christos Rammos, attended. Leaks from the meeting were circulated in the media according to which Kontoleon admitted that NIS was monitoring Koukakis and that this happened at the request of foreign services.

On August 4, 2022, the EFSYN published an investigation linking the then General Secretary of the Prime Minister, Grigoris Dimitriadis, to the company that supplies the predator software in Greece. On August 5, 2022, Dimitriadis resigned from the position of General Secretary to the Prime Minister. Less than an hour later, the leader of the NIS also resigned.

On Monday, August 8, Prime Minister Kyriakos Mitsotakis made a brief statement on the issue of wiretappings, issuing that he did not know about the wiretapping of Androulakis and that if he had known, he would not have allowed it to happen. The opposition claims that it is impossible that he did not know as NIS is under his supervision.

On August 29, the PASOK's proposal for the establishment of a commission of inquiry was upvoted.

On November 5, it was revealed that documents regarding the wiretapping had been leaked, and an extensive list of people being targeted was published.

On December 8, Mitsotakis ardently refuted in parliament the allegations that he could have ordered a surveillance of the Minister of Labour Kostis Hatzidakis, or of the Chief of the Hellenic Armed Forces, Konstantinos Floros. When asked if it is possible that departments under his personal control could have ordered it, with him claiming ignorance, he left parliament without answering.

On the same day, the Greek Foreign Ministry provided documents about its role in exporting Predator to foreign countries, despite earlier claims that the government had no relations with the company selling the spyware.

On December 16, it was revealed that ADAE, a Greek independent authority safeguarding the privacy of telecommunications, had confirmed the surveillance of MEP Giorgos Kyrtsos and investigative journalist Tasos Telloglou after carrying out an audit.

On January 24, 2023, responding to a question by Alexis Tsipras regarding six specific individuals, including Kostis Hatzidakis and Konstantinos Floros, ADAE officially confirmed that all of them had been under surveillance by the National Intelligence Service, a department under Mitsotakis' direct control.

International attention 
The international press has dealt extensively with the issue. Guardian compares the government to the Junta of the Colonels and the NYT referring to the rot at the heart of Greece. The government representative, John Oikonomou, verbally attacked the journalist of Politico, Nektaria Stamoulis for her handling of the issue, which caused the agency's reaction saying that "Nektaria was brutally abused by the Greek government". The European Commission sent a letter to the Greek Government asking about the surveillance.

The targeting of journalists during the course of the wiretapping scandal led Greece to fall from the 70th to the 108th place on the 2022 Reporters Without Borders press freedom ranking, the lowest position of any European country.

PEGA Committee 
On November 3rd the commission came to Greece to investigate the use of illegal software by the Greek government.

Namelist
On November 5, Documento newspaper published a list of names that were under surveillance. Among others, according to the claims of the newspaper, under survelliance was the former Prime Minister, Antonis Samaras, the Minister of Foreign Affairs, Nikos Dendias, the former Ministers of Citizen Protection, Olga Gerovasili and Michalis Chrisochoidis, the Regional Governor of Attica, Giorgos Patoulis, the editors Alexis Papahelas, Antonis Dellatolas and Yiannis Kourtakis, the former president of National Public Health Organization, Panagiotis Arkoumaneas, former Minister of Karamanlis' Cabinet and former Mayor of Athens, Dimitris Avramopoulos, former Minister of Samaras' Cabinet, Olga Kefalogianni, the Minister of Labour, Kostis Hatzidakis, the deputy and former Government Spokesperson, Aristotelia Peloni, former Minister of Health and current Minister of Tourism, Vasilis Kikilias, Minister for Development and Investment and Vice President of the current governing party, Adonis Georgiadis and the President of Aris FC, Theodoros Karypidis. It has been stated that the monitoring of Theodoros Karypidis was intended to side-monitor president of Olympiacos and Nottingham Forest F.C., Evangelos Marinakis.

References

Political scandals in Greece
2022 in Greece
2022 crimes in Greece